Anjalin (also Romanized as Anjalīn and Anjelīn; also known as Anjalin Tarom Sofla, Anjīleyn, Anjīlīn, Indzhleun, Īn Jal Īn, Īnjel-e Īn, Īnjel Īn, and Injlein) is a village in Alvand Rural District, in the Central District of Khorramdarreh County, Zanjan Province, Iran. At the 2006 census, its population was 148, in 33 families.

References

Populated places in Khorramdarreh County